Chen Hsiu-hsiung (born 17 November 1935) is a Taiwanese sailor. He competed at the 1968 Summer Olympics and the 1972 Summer Olympics.

References

External links
 

1935 births
Living people
Taiwanese male sailors (sport)
Olympic sailors of Taiwan
Sailors at the 1968 Summer Olympics – Dragon
Sailors at the 1972 Summer Olympics – Finn
Place of birth missing (living people)
20th-century Taiwanese people